The Beaver River is a  tributary of the Cloquet River of Minnesota, located in southern Saint Louis County.

The Beaver River flows through Grand Lake Township and Fredenberg Township, northwest of Duluth.

See also
List of rivers of Minnesota

References

Minnesota Watersheds
USGS Hydrologic Unit Map - State of Minnesota (1974)

Rivers of Minnesota
Rivers of St. Louis County, Minnesota